The Scroll of Stone is the debut album of the Romanian power metal band Magica. It was released in 2002. The album is about a princess named Alma who is tricked by a demon, she loses her soul, and so her quest begins. She has to find the scroll of stone, the only thing powerful enough to break the demon's spell.

Track listing 
 "The Wish" - 0:54
 "A Blood Red Dream" - 4:31
 "The Sun Is Gone" - 1:05
 "The Sorcerer" - 4:43
 "Road to the Unknown" - 4:40
 "Daca" - 3:56
 "E Magic" - 3:50
 "The Silent Forest" - 4:26
 "Mountains of Ice" - 5:05
 "The Key" - 2:33
 "The Scroll of Stone" - 4:31
 "Redemption" - 5:10

External links 
 

Magica (band) albums
2002 debut albums